Five-Two Television is the sixth studio album by KJ-52. Released September 22, 2009 on BEC Recordings. The first single, "End of My Rope", was made available on iTunes on July 28, 2009. KJ-52 has released a few mixtapes already – some mash-ups and some unreleased material – and planned to release more until the release of Five-Two Television. Along with the purchase of Five-Two Television, there was a free download of a mixtape collaboration between KJ-52 and Goldinchild. KJ-52 has stated that he encourages the sharing of this mixtape for evangelistic purposes. The Auto-Tune effect is used frequently throughout this album, a first for KJ-52, although on most of the songs it is used, like "Tweezy Dance" or "Adventures of Tweezyman", the Auto-Tune is used as a joke. This album won "Rap/Hip Hop Album of the Year" at the 2010 Dove Awards. It is a concept album about the fictional character Chris Carlino.

Track listing

References

External links
Rapzilla Review
Jesusfreakhideout.com Review

KJ-52 albums
2009 albums